is a Japanese pop singer and fashion model. She is a member of Berryz Kobo (activities suspended indefinitely) and former member of Hello! Project Kids. Her signature color is green.

Born in Kanagawa, Japan. Her blood type is B, and her height is 181 cm. She belongs to UP-FRONT CREATE and Tateoka Office.

Career
 June 30, 2002 - passed Hello! Project Kids audition and became a member of Hello! Project Kids.
 March 3, 2004 - made a major debut as a member of Berryz Kobo.
 August 29, 2007 - released the first solo photobook "Yurina".
 April 3, 2009 - chosen a member of Guardians 4.
 December 17, 2011 - premiere of the movie "Ōsama Game", where she had her first starring role.
 October 28, 2012 - opened an official blog “Enjoy!”.
 March 3, 2015 - Berryz Kobo’s activities suspended indefinitely.
 September 30, 2015 - taking part in her first model shooting session reported on her personal blog.
 January 14, 2016 - presented a new dress by fashion designer Yumi Katsura at the “Yumi Katsura ParisColle Dress Presentation” held in Tokyo.
 February 16, 2016 - made her runway debut at “YUMI KATSURA 2016 GRAND COLLECTION IN TOKYO” held in Tokyo International Forum.
 May 1, 2018 - it was announced that she would also belong to Tateoka Office as a model.
 March 20, 2019 - appeared in Tae Ashida’s Fall Winter 2019 show at “Japan Fashion Week (in Tokyo)”, held in Grand Hyatt Tokyo.
 August 4, 2022 - it was announced that she was appointed as the creative director of the fashion brand "LANSE".
 January 1, 2023 - moved from J.P ROOM to UP-FRONT CREATE.

Discography

Filmography

Television
 Little Hospital (January - March 2003, TV Tokyo)
  (April 5, 2005 – May 18, 2005, TV Tokyo)
 The Girls Live (January 17, 2014 - , TV Tokyo)
 King's Brunch (October 10, 2015 - March 27, 2021, TBS Television)
 Ichiya Zuke (March 27, 2017 – March 2018, TV Tokyo)
 Kanaful TV (April 1, 2018 - , TV Kanagawa)

Radio
  (March 30, 2005 – March 31, 2009)
 Tsūkai! Berryz Ōkoku (July 3, 2009 – March 30, 2012) (Co-host: Sugaya Risako and Natsuyaki Miyabi)
 BZS1422 (July 8, 2012 – March 1, 2015, Radio Nippon) (Co-host: Chinami Tokunaga)

Commercials 
 Japan meat information service center, J Beef “Oniku Sukisuki” (2003)
 Base Ball Bear “(WHAT IS THE) LOVE & POP?” (2009)
 Takashimaya “Spring All-Store Super Point Week” (2017)
 Toyota U group “KINTO” (2019)

Movies 
 Koinu Dan no Monogatari (2002, Toei)
  (2004, Kadokawa)
 Ōsama Game (2011, BS-TBS) as Chiemi Honda

Solo DVDs 
 Photobook “Yurina” making DVD 〜Special edition〜 (October 20, 2007, UP-FRONT WORKS)
 Photobook “FLOWERAGE” making DVD 〜Special edition〜 (September 16, 2009, UP-FRONT WORKS)
 Photobook “KumaSpo!” making DVD 〜Special edition〜 (January 28, 2011, UP-FRONT WORKS)
 one day in autumn (December 22, 2011, UP-FRONT WORKS)
 Lily (April 18, 2012, UP-FRONT WORKS)
 brand new day (October 5, 2013, UP-FRONT WORKS)

Bibliography

Photobooks 
 Yurina (August 29, 2007, KIDS NET, ISBN 978-4-04-894500-4)
 FLOWERAGE (July 25, 2009, KIDS NET, ISBN 978-4-04-895049-7)
 KumaSpo! Alo-Hello! (December 17, 2010, KIDS NET, ISBN 978-4-04-895411-2)

Books 

 Complex ni Sayōnara! (October 15, 2018, ODYSSEY BOOKS, ISBN 978-4-8470-8155-2)

Hello! Project groups and units 
 Hello! Project Kids
 Berryz Kobo (2004 – 2015)
 Guardians 4 (2009 – 2010)
 Matchas (2011 - )
 Yurina Kumai & Minnies.? (2018 - )
 Hello! Project Shuffle Unit
 H.P. All Stars (2004)
 Tanpopo# (2009 – 2011)
 Hello! Project Mobekimasu (2011)

References

External links
 Official Hello! Project profile
 
 Yurina Kumai's Height

1993 births
Living people
Berryz Kobo members
Hello! Project Kids members
Japanese idols
Japanese child singers
Japanese women pop singers
Japanese female models
Tanpopo members
Musicians from Kanagawa Prefecture
21st-century Japanese singers
21st-century Japanese women singers